Shahrak-e Isar (also Romanized as Shahrak-e Īs̄ār) is a village in Korbal Rural District, in the Central District of Kharameh County, Fars Province, Iran. At the 2006 census, its population was 1,800, in 420 families.

References 

Populated places in Kharameh County